Megalancosaurus is a genus of extinct reptile from the Late Triassic Dolomia di Forni Formation and Zorzino Limestone of northern Italy, and one of the best known drepanosaurids. The type species is M. preonensis; a translation of the animal's scientific name would be "long armed reptile from the Preone Valley."

Anatomy 

 
Megalancosaurus was fairly small, its adult length was only about 25 centimeters (10 inches). It was built like a chameleon and probably lived a similar arboreal lifestyle, feeding on insects and other small animals. Even its feet were chameleon like, with two toes being opposed to the remaining three. The tail is long, prehensile, and bears a strange claw-like organ made of fused vertebrae at its end. Its shoulders formed a withers that would have served as an attachment site for especially strong muscles.

Some specimens have an opposable digit on the feet. Because not all members of the species appear to bear this digit, it has been speculated that it is an instance of sexual dimorphism, only being possessed by whichever sex needed a stronger grip on the branch during copulation.

The head of Megalancosaurus is superficially very birdlike. The skull was roughly 30 mm long and 12 mm tall. The eyes were large and the snout was narrow. Towards the tip of the snout were two small premaxillary teeth, which were separated by a diastema from at least 22 small maxillary teeth. The orbits were directed anteriorly, suggesting that Megalancosaurus had good binocular vision.

It has been proposed that Megalancosaurus was capable of gliding, though while not fully ruled out it has largely been dismissed.

History 
Megalancosaurus preonensis was first described in 1980. Its discoverers interpreted it as an archosaur, based in part on the belief that it had an antorbital fenestra. In 1994, two specimens originally thought to be juveniles of Drepanosaurus were assigned to the species. This discovery led to the realization that it was a drepanosaurid. Since then, it has been regarded as one of the most derived members of the group.

Related genera 
 Dolabrosaurus
 Drepanosaurus
 Hypuronector
 Vallesaurus

References

External links 
 Hairy Museum of Natural History page on simosaurs

Drepanosaurs
Late Triassic reptiles of Europe
Fossils of Italy
Fossil taxa described in 1981
Prehistoric reptile genera